This is a list of veal dishes, which use or may use veal as a primary ingredient. Veal is the meat of young calves, in contrast to the beef from older cattle. Though veal can be produced from a calf of either sex and any breed, most veal comes from male calves. Generally, veal is more expensive than beef from older cattle.

Veal dishes
 Blanquette de veau – a French ragout in which neither the veal nor the butter is browned in the cooking process
 Bockwurst – a German sausage traditionally made from ground veal and pork
 
 Bratwurst – a sausage usually composed of veal, pork or beef
 
 
 Carpaccio – prepared using raw meat; veal is sometimes used
 Cotoletta – is an Italian word for a breaded cutlet of veal
 Hortobágyi palacsinta – a savory Hungarian pancake, filled with meat (usually veal)
 
 Karađorđeva šnicla
 Ossobuco 
 Pariser Schnitzel – prepared from a thin slice of veal, salted, dredged in flour and beaten eggs, and pan fried in clarified butter or lard
 Veal  
 
 Piccata – a method of preparing food: meat is sliced, coated, sautéed, and served in a sauce. The dish originated in Italy using veal.
 Ragout fin consists of veal, sweetbread, calf brain, tongue, and bone marrow, and chicken breast and fish
 
  
  
 
  
 
 
  
  
 Vitello tonnato – a Piedmontese dish of cold, sliced veal covered with a creamy, mayonnaise-like sauce that has been flavored with tuna
 Wallenbergare 
 Weisswurst – a traditional Bavarian sausage made from minced veal and pork back bacon
 Wiener Schnitzel – a very thin, breaded and pan-fried cutlet made from veal, it is one of the best-known specialities of Viennese cuisine. The Wiener Schnitzel is the national dish of Austria.
 Zürcher Geschnetzeltes

See also

 List of beef dishes
 Lists of prepared foods

References

 
Veal dishes